is a Japanese singer and actor associated with Johnny & Associates. and former member of Hey! Say! JUMP.

Early life

Okamoto was born in Tokyo to Kenichi Okamoto, a former member of the rock band Otokogumi, and model Katsue Nishi. He was educated at Framlingham College in England before returning to the Tokyo Metropolitan Area.

Career
In October 2006, he started work with the Johnny & Associates talent agency as a Johnny's Jr. On September 21, 2007, he debuted as a member of Hey! Say! JUMP. While he was a member, he wrote the lyrics to the song "Hero" and composed the song "H.our Time." He, occasionally, plays guitar along with Kota Yabu and Hikaru Yaotome in their concerts.

In March 2011, Okamoto made his acting debut in the final episode of long-running drama Kinpachi Sensei as a delinquent student.

In June 2018, following the announcement of Hey! Say! JUMP's single, "Cosmic Human", Okamoto announced that he was taking a break from entertainment to study abroad at the American Academy of Dramatic Arts, beginning in September.

Personal life
Okamoto enrolled in Sophia University in 2012, but he revealed in 2018 that he dropped out.

Discography

Filmography

TV drama 
 Kinpachi-sensei Final SP(March 27, 2011)
 First Class Season 2

Variety shows 
 Shounen Club
 Hyakushiki
 YanYan JUMP (April 2011)
 Itadaki High JUMP

TV appearances 
For Hey! Say! JUMP-related appearances, please see Hey! Say! JUMP.
 School Kakumei 
 「今からでも遅くない！？英会話のススメ」as Guest Teacher (20150201)
 「話せないのは時代遅れ？！英会話のススメ」as Guest Teacher
 「今からでも遅くない！？英会話のススメ」as Guest Teacher (20160117)
 「今からでも遅くない！？英会話のススメ」as Guest Teacher (20160612)
 「今からでも遅くない！？英会話のススメ」as Guest Teacher (20161211)

TV commercials/advertisements
 Deca Sports – Wii
 LOTTE Ghana (2009)
 LOTTE Plus X Fruitio (2010)
 LOTTE Fruitio Squash
 Vermount Curry (2013)

References

External links
 Hey! Say! JUMP
 Johnny's-net

1993 births
Living people
Japanese male pop singers
Japanese idols
Johnny & Associates
Hey! Say! JUMP members
Singers from Tokyo
Male actors from Tokyo
21st-century Japanese singers
21st-century Japanese male singers